Several municipalities in the Canadian province of Quebec held municipal elections to elect mayors and councillors on October 25, 1970.

The most closely watched contest was in Montreal, where the election took place against the backdrop of the FLQ Crisis. Incumbent mayor Jean Drapeau was re-elected by a landslide and his party won every seat on the city council.

Results

Montreal

Source: Election results, 1833-2005 (in French), City of Montreal.

 
1970